Sherman Township is a township in Pocahontas County, Iowa, USA.

History
Sherman Township was established in 1880. It is named for William Tecumseh Sherman.

References

Townships in Pocahontas County, Iowa
Townships in Iowa